Acts 26 is the twenty-sixth chapter of the Acts of the Apostles in the New Testament of the Christian Bible. It records the period of Paul's imprisonment in Caesarea. The book containing this chapter is anonymous, but Holman states that "uniform Christian tradition affirms that Luke wrote both" this book as well as the Gospel of Luke, as supported by Guthrie based on external evidence.

Text
The original text was written in Koine Greek. This chapter is divided into 32 verses.

Textual witnesses
Some early manuscripts containing the text of this chapter are:
Papyrus 29 (3rd century; extant verses 7–8, 20)
Codex Vaticanus (325–350)
Codex Sinaiticus (330–360)
Codex Bezae (c. 400)
Codex Alexandrinus (400–440)
Codex Ephraemi Rescriptus (~450; extant verses 1–18)
Codex Laudianus (~550; extant verses 1–28)

Location

The events in this chapter took place in Caesarea.

Theme

Paul took up the invitation to speak: "Agrippa said to Paul, “You are permitted to speak for yourself" with an account of his early life, conversion and faith. Luke presents two contrasting responses:

 Governor Festus said, "You are beside yourself! Much learning is driving you mad!” (Acts 26:24)
 King Agrippa said, "You almost persuade me to become a Christian.” (Acts 26:28)

Paul's speech before Agrippa II and Bernice (26:1–23)
Following the custom of the first century, Paul's speech begins with a standard captatio benevolentiae (congratulating his auditor on the expert ability to judge the case; verses 2–3), followed by a reprise of his own life-story, focusing on Judaism (cf. Galatians 1:13—14), with the emphasis on Jerusalem, in his Pharisaic background (verses 4–5; cf. Acts 23:6, Philippians 3:5—6), his persecution of the Christians (verses 9–11; cf. Galatians 1:13; Philippians 3:6; 1 Corinthians 15:9) and his conversion to be the follower of Christ. The conversion story was already recorded twice (Acts 9:1—18 in narrative and Acts 22:6—16 in Paul's own words) but a functional redundancy is an indicator of rhetorical importance, with slight variations and the significant addition of 'in the Hebrew language' (verse 14) showing that this time it is addressed to a Greek-speaking audience (whereas previously was in 'Hebrew', or Aramaic; Acts 21:40). An expansion of heavenly voice here includes a proverbial saying ('It hurts you to kick against the goads'; not found in 9:4 or 22:7), which parallels Greek writings (cf. esp. Euripides. The Bacchae, 794–5).

Paul's challenge to Agrippa (26:24-32)
The speech was brought to closure with a 'lively piece of dialogue' which contrasts between "madness" (verse 24) and "sober truth" (verse 25), turning into a direct challenge to Agrippa, verses 26–29). The end of the speech clearly displays the real object of Paul's persuasive rhetoric: 'not exoneration but conversion', so 'all who are listening' to Paul (verse 29) are invited to 'become a Christian' (verse 28), but nonetheless it results in the reinforcement of his innocence as both Festus and Agrippa were convinced that Paul has committed no crime (verses 31–22).

Verse 24
At this point Festus interrupted Paul's defense. "You are out of your mind, Paul!" he shouted. "Your great learning is driving you insane."

The phrase  is translated here as "great learning" rather than the possibly more literal "many books". If the latter had been the intention the word  probably would have been used.

Verse 28
King James Version:
Then Agrippa said unto Paul, Almost thou persuadest me to be a Christian.

New International Version:
Then Agrippa said to Paul, "Do you think that in such a short time you can persuade me to be a Christian?"

While the first translation is the more literal, the king, a rich and secular man, is possibly speaking ironically.

Methodist founder John Wesley preached a sermon entitled "The Almost Christian", based on this verse, at St. Mary's, Oxford, on 25 July 1741. It is sermon 2 in his standard collection of sermons. Wesley's companion George Whitefield also preached a sermon with the same title referring to the same verse.

A "Christian" (Christianon, nominative: Christianos): this is the third mention of the term in the New Testament. The first use was in Antioch (Acts 11:26), where the writer of Acts refers to the novelty of the term, and the term is also used by  Peter in 1 Peter 4:16: If anyone suffers as a Christian .... All three usages are considered to reflect a derisive element referring to the followers of Christ who did not acknowledge the emperor of Rome.

See also 
 Bernice
 Related Bible parts: Acts 9, Acts 22, Acts 25, Acts 27

References

Sources

External links
 King James Bible - Wikisource
English Translation with Parallel Latin Vulgate
Online Bible at GospelHall.org (ESV, KJV, Darby, American Standard Version, Bible in Basic English)
Multiple bible versions at Bible Gateway (NKJV, NIV, NRSV etc.)

26